Guatemalan People's Party is a political party in Guatemala lead by Neto Bran.

History
The mayor of Mixco Neto Bran was part of several political parties, including: the Reform Movement, with which he won the mayor's office in 2015, and Todos, with which he won re-election in 2019.

In November 2020, Neto Bran was appointed secretary general of the Todos party, but after disputes with party founder Felipe Alejos, Bran announced his resignation from Todos in February 2021.

In December 2021, Bran announced his affiliation to the Guatemalan People's Party. The party was legalized in July 2022.

Electoral results

Presidential elections

Congress of the Republic

References

External links

2020 establishments in Guatemala
Political parties established in 2020
Political parties in Guatemala